The FIA WTCC Race of Spain 2009 was the fifth round of the 2009 World Touring Car Championship season and the fifth running of the FIA WTCC Race of Spain. It was held on 31 May 2009 at the Circuit Ricardo Tormo in Cheste, near Valencia in Spain. The first race was won by Gabriele Tarquini for SEAT Sport and the second race was won by Augusto Farfus for BMW Team Germany.

Background
SEAT Sport driver Yvan Muller was leading the drivers' championship coming into the event, BMW driver Farfus was six points behind in second and Gabriele Tarquini was a further five points behind. Franz Engstler was leading the Yokohama Independents' Trophy with Félix Porteiro second.

Having missed the previous round at Pau due to damage sustained at the Race of Morocco, Vito Postiglione returned to the championship with Scuderia Proteam Motorsport.

After a disappointing performance at Pau, the SEAT León TDIs were given a 0.2 bar increase in boost pressure for the Race of Spain to return the diesels to competitive form.

Report

Free Practice
Yvan Muller set the pace in the opening free practice session, the increase in boost pressure for the TDI engine produced a SEAT 1–2–3 result. Tom Coronel was the leading petrol car, Nicola Larini was the leading Chevrolet car and the heavier BMWs were led by Farfus in ninth.

SEAT stayed on top in the second practice session, this time courtesy of Tiago Monteiro. Farfus was second for BMW and Larini was third for Chevrolet. Jaap van Lagen did not participate in the session, as the engine was changed in his LADA Sport Lada 110 2.0. The session was interrupted with a red flag when Jordi Gené went off the circuit and left gravel on the track.

Qualifying
Tarquini set pole position on his final timed lap, to achieve his first pole since the 2007 Race of Germany. SEAT Sport locked out the first two rows of the grid at their home event with Yvan Muller second, Gené third and Monteiro fourth. SEAT driver Rickard Rydell was fastest in Q1 at the head of a 1–2–3 for the marque, while Farfus was the only BMW to escape Q1. All three Chevrolet drivers progressed to Q2 while both LADAs lined up near the back of the grid. With SEAT claiming the first four positions in Q2, Farfus separated them from the leading Chevrolet of Alain Menu. SUNRED Engineering's Tom Coronel was the only independent driver to make it into Q2, and he lined up tenth for the first race.

Warm-Up
Rydell was fastest in Sunday morning warm up session with pole sitter Tarquini thirteenth.

Race One
Yvan Muller made a good start to take the lead from Tarquini straight away, while Monteiro also passed Tarquini to finish second. Having dropped out in Q1, triple champion Andy Priaulx battled through from fourteenth to fifth while the leading BMW of Farfus had a difficult race amongst the SEATs. He recovered after Gené pushed him wide, he then dropped down to seventh when he was involved in a tangle with Rydell, Menu and Gené but he then climbed up the order to claim fourth. This was helped by Jörg Müller dropping two places at the final corner. Coronel was the independent winner having finished seventh while further down the order, BMW Team Italy-Spain driver Sergio Hernández and Wiechers-Sport's Stefano D'Aste battled over the eighth place which would become pole position for race two, with Hernández coming out victorious.

Race Two
The second race saw a 1–2 finish for BMW Team Germany, with Farfus winning and Jörg Müller second. Jörg Müller had started from third and took the lead of the race which he held until the third lap, when Farfus assumed the race lead. The leading pair distanced themselves from the rest of the field which was being led by Tarquini and Priaulx in the battle for the third and final podium spot. Ultimately, it was Tarquini to finish third, to deny BMW a 1–2–3 finish. Coronel started on the front row but could not match the start of the rear-wheel drive BMW of pole sitter Hernández. Coronel finished tenth and Hernández sixth, while D'Aste took the independent win with ninth place.

Results

Qualifying

Race 1

Bold denotes Fastest lap.

Race 2

Bold denotes Fastest lap.

Championship standings

Drivers' Championship standings

Yokohama Independents' Trophy standings

Manufacturers' Championship standings

 Note: Only the top five positions are included for both sets of drivers' standings.

References

External links 
Results Booklet PDF at MST Systems

Spain
Race of Spain